Pohang Sports Complex is a multi-use stadium in Pohang, South Korea. The stadium was used by the Pohang Steelers until the Pohang Steel Yard opened in 1990. The capacity of the stadium is 22,934 spectators.

External links
Pohang Stadium at allstadiums.ru 
Pohang Stadium at worldstadiums.com

Athletics (track and field) venues in South Korea
Football venues in South Korea
Multi-purpose stadiums in South Korea
Sports venues in North Gyeongsang Province
Sports venues completed in 1971
1971 establishments in South Korea
20th-century architecture in South Korea